Phyllidiella rudmani is a species of sea slug, a dorid nudibranch, a shell-less marine gastropod mollusk in the family Phyllidiidae.

Distribution 
This species was described from Papua New Guinea with additional specimens from Fiji, Solomon Islands, Taiwan, Thailand and the Great Barrier Reef, Queensland. It has been reported from the Maldives and Sulawesi.

Description
This nudibranch has a pale pink dorsum with white-capped tubercles. There are two narrow black lines which run in a straight line between the tubercles, joining at the tail. The rhinophores are black with a pink base.

Diet
This species feeds on the sponge Phakellia sp.

References

External links
 

Phyllidiidae
Gastropods described in 1993